Shiraishi is a Japanese surname. Notable people with the surname include:

Ashima Shiraishi (born 2001), American rock climber
, Japanese actress, voice actress and narrator
, Japanese actress and voice actress
, former Japanese model, adult video (AV) actress, and a movie and TV actress
, Japanese film and television director
, Japanese sprinter
, Japanese sailor
, Japanese singer, model, YouTuber and actress
, Japanese sport shooter

, Japanese actress and media personality
, Japanese army officer
, Japanese actress
, Japanese actor and voice actor
, Japanese singer and lyricist
, Japanese voice actress and singer

Fictional characters
, a character in the manga series Chu-Bra!!
, a character in the game  Hatsune Miku: Colorful Stage!

See also
Musashi-Shiraishi Station
Shiraishi Hanjiro Shigeaki
Shiraishi Island

Japanese-language surnames